Crematogaster crassicornis is a species of ant in tribe Crematogastrini. It was described by Emery in 1893.

References

crassicornis
Insects described in 1893